The Mozambique Channel is an arm of the Indian Ocean located between the Southeast African countries of Madagascar and Mozambique. A warm current, the Mozambique Current, flows in a southward direction in the channel, leading into the Agulhas Current off the east coast of Southern Africa.

Extent
The International Hydrographic Organization (IHO) defines the limits of the Mozambique Channel as follows:

On the North. A line from the estuary of the River Rovuma to Ras Habu, the northernmost point of Ile Grande Comore, the northernmost of the Comore (Comoro) Islands, to Cap d'Ambre (Cape Amber), the northern extremity of Madagascar.

On the East. The west coast of Madagascar.

On the South. A line from Cap Sainte-Marie, the southern extremity of Madagascar to Ponto do Ouro on the mainland.

On the West. The coast of Southern Africa.

Islands in the channel

Comoros
Grande Comore
Mohéli
Anjouan

France
Region of France: Mayotte (claimed by Comoros)
Scattered Islands in the Indian Ocean, district of French Southern and Antarctic Lands:
Glorioso Islands (claimed by Madagascar and Comoros)
Juan de Nova Island (claimed by Madagascar)
Europa Island (claimed by Madagascar)
Bassas da India (claimed by Madagascar)

Mozambique
Primeiras and Segundas Archipelago

History

World War II

Graf Spee Incident 
On 15 November 1939, under the command of Captain Patrick (Paddy) Dove, the British Coastal Tanker Africa Shell was plying through the Mozambique Channel en-passage from Quelimane to Lourenco Marques sailing in ballast. Graf Spee ordered the Africa Shell to stop by the firing of a shot across her bow.

Having stopped the Africa Shell, a cutter with a boarding party was despatched from the Graf Spee and subsequently boarded the tanker, the officer in charge addressing Captain Dove in perfect English with the sentence: "Good morning, captain. Sorry; fortunes of war."

In time, the boarding party ordered the ship's company, save the Africa Shell's Master, into their lifeboats before stripping the Africa Shell of all foodstuffs including a small amount of wine.
The crew were ordered to row for shore, however Captain Dove was taken prisoner on board the Graf Spee where he was to be held captive. Capt. Dove was incensed by the interception of his ship, and complained personally to Capt. Langsdorff, citing that the Africa Shell was within Portuguese Territorial Waters and that the action was in clear violation of international law.

With the crew of the Africa Shell making their way to the shore, and with Capt. Dove transferred to the Graf Spee, the boarding party proceeded to set about the operation of sinking the tanker. Scuttling charges were placed within the ship, and their timers set, following which the party re-embarked in the motor launch and made their way back to the Graf Spee. With all personnel safely aboard the Graf Spee, Langsdorff and his crew observed the detonation of the charges which blew two holes in the Africa Shell's stern. Following this Graf Spee opened fire using some of her secondary armament of  SK C/28 guns, sinking the Africa Shell.

Battle of Madagascar 
The Mozambique Channel was a World War II clashpoint during the Battle of Madagascar.

References

External links
 Japanese Submarines at Madagascar and the Mozambique Channel
 

 
Channels of the Indian Ocean
Straits of Africa
Borders of Mozambique
Borders of Madagascar
International straits
Borders of the Comoros
Borders of the French Southern and Antarctic Lands